Elizabeth Estaugh, née Haddon (May 25, 1680 – March 30, 1762) was an American pioneer. She was the founder of Haddon Township and Haddonfield, New Jersey.

Early years
Elizabeth Haddon was born in Southwark, London, England, May 25, 1680. She was the third child of John Haddon, a blacksmith, and Elizabeth, née Clarke. Her father was a Quaker who faced religious persecution and was convinced by William Penn to move abroad. In 1702, he bought a 500-acre (2 km2) tract of land in Gloucester County in the English colony of West Jersey. However, he was appointed as an officer of the Pennsylvania Land Company and the London Lead Company, so he did not leave England.

Career

Haddon, a single woman, set sail from Southwark to the New World in 1701 without her family at the age of nineteen. Her father had a house built for her at Cooper's Creek, Newtown Township. With the help of a widowed friend and two manservants, she developed the Haddonfield plantation.

She had met John Estaugh (1676–1742), a Quaker minister, at Bermondsey years before. Their courtship was described, fancifully, by Lydia Maria Child in The Youthful Emigrant. A True Story of the Early Settlement of New Jersey, first published on May 21, 1845, in the New-York Daily Tribune. Henry Wadsworth Longfellow drew on Child's account in writing Elizabeth, a poem in the third volume of his Tales of a Wayside Inn. They were married on the banks of the Cooper's Creek on December 1, 1702.

Haddon and John had no children, but they brought her sister's son, Ebenezer Hopkins, to America from Southwark when he was about five, and raised him as their son and heir. Ebenezer was the son of Benjamin and Sarah (Haddon) Hopkins, and the grandson of William and Katheryn Hopkins. Ebenezer was the progenitor of the Hopkins family of Haddonfield, New Jersey.

In 1713, John and Elizabeth built a three-story brick mansion called New Haddonfield Plantation, where Haddon managed the family property and her husband tended to his missionary journeys; the Brew House she built in 1713 still stands in the backyard. Although the first recorded commercial female brewer in the Colonies was Mary Lisle, who inherited her father's Philadelphia brewpub in 1734, there is reason to believe that across the river in South Jersey, Haddon was running a more-than-average homebrew operation.

She and her husband were active in the Quaker community. She was very close with Elizabeth Woolman, the sister of John Woolman. Elizabeth died at her Haddonfield home at the age of 82 on March 30, 1762. She was buried in an unmarked grave in the Burial Ground of the Haddonfield Monthly Meeting of the Religious Society of Friends (Quakers).

References

Further reading

External links
Collection: Haddon-Estaugh-Hopkins papers. TriCollege Libraries: Archives and Manuscripts, Bryn Mawr, Haverford, Swarthmore.

1680 births
1762 deaths
17th-century Quakers
18th-century Quakers
American Quakers
English emigrants
People from Haddon Township, New Jersey
People from Southwark
People of colonial New Jersey
Haddonfield, New Jersey
Haddon Township, New Jersey
People from Haddonfield, New Jersey
American city founders